Staphylinus erythropterus is a species of rove beetles native to Europe.

References

Staphylinidae
Beetles described in 1758
Taxa named by Carl Linnaeus
Beetles of Europe